Pavelló Municipal Font de Sant Lluís (Spanish: Pabellón Municipal Fuente San Luis, known as La Fonteta) is an indoor arena that is located in Valencia, Spain. Built in 1983, it is primarily used for basketball games, and it is the home arena of the Spanish Liga ACB club Valencia Basket. The arena has a seating capacity of 9,000 people.

History
La Fonteta was originally built in 1983. Valencia Basket started to play its games in the arena in 1987. The arena was also used as the home arena of the women's basketball team, Ros Casares Valencia, and the futsal team Valencia FS.

On 9 to 11 April 2010, the Fonteta hosted the Final Four of the 2009–10 EuroLeague Women season, where Ros Casares Valencia was defeated in the final by Spartak Moscow Region.

In 2016, Valencia Basket financed the renovation of the arena with €500,000, and also installed a new €150,000 center-hung scoreboard.

It will host several group phase matches for the FIBA Women's EuroBasket 2021 with France and the country.

The construction of the Casal España Arena, a new arena located in the nearby plot used as parking lot for the attendants to La Fonteta, started in June 2020.

Gallery

See also
 List of indoor arenas in Spain

References

External links

Font de Sant Lluís at Valencia BC official website
Font de Sant Lluís Video of the Arena
Font de Sant Lluís at Valencia City Council website

Font de San Lluis
Font de San Lluis
Font de San Lluis
Buildings and structures in Valencia
Sports venues in Valencia